Duane Brooks (born June 24, 1987) is an American football wide receiver for the Guangzhou Power of the China Arena Football League (CAFL). He played College Football at Stephen F. Austin University after transferring from Central Michigan University. He also been a member of the Colorado Ice, Spokane Shock and Portland Thunder.

Professional career

Portland Thunder
Brooks became one of the best return men in the AFL during the 2015 season. During the 2015 season, Brooks set an AFL record with his eighth kick return of the season for a touchdown. Brooks' record-breaking return season lead to his selection as a First Team All-Arena member as the kick-returner. Brooks was also awarded the J. Lewis Small Playmaker of the Year award.

Guangzhou Power
Brooks was selected by the Guangzhou Power of the China Arena Football League (CAFL) in the ninth round of the 2016 CAFL Draft. He caught 32 passes for 325 yards and 4 touchdowns during the 2016 season. He is listed on the Power's roster for the 2018 season.

AFL statistics

Stats from ArenaFan:

References

External links
Stephen F. Austin bio
Arena Football League bio

1987 births
American football wide receivers
American football return specialists
Living people
Central Michigan Chippewas football players
Stephen F. Austin Lumberjacks football players
Colorado Crush (IFL) players
Spokane Shock players
Portland Thunder players
Guangzhou Power players